Tondi is a subdistrict in the district of Kristiine, Tallinn, the capital of Estonia. It has a population of 3,862.

The Tallinn–Paldiski railway passes Tondi on its eastern side. There's a station named "Tondi" on the Elron western route.

Audentes Sports Center is located in Tondi.

Gallery

References

Subdistricts of Tallinn